You're My World is the English translation of the Italian ballad "Il mio mondo". The phrase may also refer to:
"You're My World", a song by Emilia Rydberg from her 2009 album My World
"(You're) My World", a song by Joe Satriani from his self-titled 1995 album